Lake Josephine is located in Glacier National Park, in the U. S. state of Montana. Swiftcurrent Lake is immediately to the northeast of Lake Josephine and the two lakes are separated by a short stream.

See also
List of lakes in Glacier County, Montana

References

Josephine
Josephine